Edison High School is a public high school in Milan, Ohio.  It is the only high school in the Edison Local Schools district.
The elementary school is located in Milan. The middle school is in Berlin Heights.

Edison was created in 1968 when the school districts from Berlin Heights and Milan consolidated.

Athletics
The Edison Chargers compete in the Sandusky Bay Conference and wear the colors of blue and orange.  They had previously competed in the Firelands Conference from 1968-1986, while prior to the consolidation, Berlin Heights and Milan had helped form the FC in 1960.

Sandusky Bay Conference championships (1986-present)
Volleyball - 1993, 2010*, 2011
Boys Basketball - 2008-09, 2010–11
Girls Basketball - 1991-92*
Baseball - 1992
Softball - 1991, 1992*, 1994, 1995*, 2012
Boys Cross Country - 2008
Boys Football - 2015
Tennis - 2015
(shared titles are noted with an (*) asterisk)

Firelands Conference championships (1960-1986)
Football - 1962 (Berlin Heights), 1964 (Milan), 1965 (Berlin Heights), 1966 (Milan), 1967 (Milan), 1971, 1975, 1976, 1979, 1980, 1981, 1982
Boys Basketball - 1967-68 (Milan)
Girls Basketball -
Wrestling - 1970-71, 1971–72, 1972–73, 1973–74, 1977–78, 1978–79, 1979–80, 1980–81
Baseball -
Softball -
Boys Track & Field - 1979, 1980, 1982, 1983, 1984,
Girls Track & Field - 1979, 1982, 1984

Ohio High School Athletic Association State Championships

 Boys Track and Field – 2002 
 Girls Golf - 2016
 Team Wrestling (Dual Meet) - 2017, 2020, 2021

References

External links
 Edison High School Basketball Win/Loss Records courtesy of North Central Ohio Basketball
 District Website

High schools in Erie County, Ohio
Public high schools in Ohio
1968 establishments in Ohio